The 16th Golden Rooster Awards, honoring the best in film, were given on 1996, Kunming, Yunnan province.

Winners and nominees

Best Film
Red Cherry/红樱桃Kong Fansen/孔繁森
吴二哥请神
The Winner/赢家

Best Director Wu Tianming - The King of Masks
Ye Daying - Red Cherry
Ning Ying - Police Story
Chen Guoxing/Wang Ping - Kong Fansen

Best Directorial Debut
Huo Jianqi - The Winner
Liu Bingyan - The Inkstone-bed
Zhang Jian Dong - Kite of My Childhood

Best Writing
not awarded this year
Si Wu - The Winner
Fan Yuan/Liu Xiaoshuang - 吴二哥请神

Best Actor
Gao Ming - Kong Fansen
Shao Bing - The Winner
Cao Jingyang - 吴二哥请神

Best Actress
Song Chunli - Jiuxiang
Guo Keyu - Red Cherry
Cao Cuifen - Orphan's Tears

Best Supporting Actor
Zhao Jun - 吴二哥请神
Xu Men - The Sorrow of Brook Steppe

Best Supporting Actress
Zheng Weili - 吴二哥请神
Jiang Yao - Kong Fansen and Yang Kaihui

Best Ensemble Cast
Ensemble Cast - The Sorrow of Brook Steppe

Best Art Direction
Chen Shaomian - Evening liaison
Liu Xingang/Aori Lige - The Sorrow of Brook Steppe
Quan Rongzhe - The Inkstone-bed
Teng Jie - Peach Blossom

Best Cinematography
Xiao Feng - Evening liaison
Zhang Li - Red Cherry
Zhao Lei - The Winner
Mu Deyuan - The King of Masks

Best Editing
Zhang Jianhua - The Sorrow of Brook Steppe
Wang Xiaoming - Red Cherry
Zhou Ying - 混在北京
Zhou Xiajuan/Wang Hancheng - 大江东去

Best Make-up
Chao Ying - The Sorrow of Brook Steppe

Best Music
Zhao Jiping - Kong Fansen
Yang Liqing - Red Cherry

Best Sound Recording
Li Lanhua - Red Cherry
Zhang Wen - The King of Masks
Dong Yan - Evening liaison

Best Animation
Little Heroes/自顾英雄出少年

Best Documentary
Great Wall/长城
Chen Jiageng/陈嘉庚
难忘辉煌
较量！抗美援朝战争实录

References

External links
历届金鸡奖名单

1996
Golden
Gold